"Blind" (stylized in all caps) is a song by American rapper DaBaby, featuring vocals from fellow American rapper Young Thug. It was sent to rhythmic contemporary radio as the third single from the deluxe edition of his third studio album, Blame It On Baby, and its fifth and final overall single, on September 1, 2020. The two artists wrote the song along with its producers Wheezy and Dr. Luke.

Background and composition
The guitar-driven track finds DaBaby singing a bit, different from his usual rapping flow and similar to Young Thug's singing at the second half of the song. The rappers reflect on their life in the streets before fame.

Music video
The official music video for the song was released on November 16, 2020. Directed by Motion Family, it begins with a tribute to DaBaby's older brother Glenn Johnson, who died earlier in the month. DaBaby invites his grandfather (played by another person) to spend the day with him and Young Thug at his video shoot as a treat for his 90th birthday. The senior follows the artists as they entertain themselves in the filming and sometimes disrupts it.

Live performances
DaBaby performed the song at the MTV Video Music Awards on August 30, 2020, along with his songs from the album, "Rockstar" and "Peep Hole", as a medley of all three.

Charts

Certifications

References

2020 singles
2020 songs
DaBaby songs
Young Thug songs
Songs written by DaBaby
Songs written by Young Thug
Songs written by Wheezy (record producer)
Songs written by Dr. Luke
Song recordings produced by Dr. Luke
Song recordings produced by Wheezy (record producer)
Interscope Records singles